Priochirus is a genus of beetles belonging to the family Staphylinidae. This genus includes about 270 species widespread in Neotropical, Palaearctic, Madagascan, Oriental, Australian and Oceanic Regions.

Selected species
 Priochirus acietis P. J. M. Greenslade, 1971 (Papua New Guinea)
 Priochirus albertisi Fauvel, 1878 (New Guinea)
 Priochirus bakerianus Bernhauer, 1926 (Borneo, Indonesia)
 Priochirus bicolor Cameron, 1937 (New Guinea)
 Priochirus bicornis Fauvel, 1864 (Mexico)
 Priochirus bifurcatus Fauvel, 1879 (New Guinea)
 Priochirus borneensis Cameron, 1928 (Borneo)
 Priochirus cameroni Scheerpeltz, 1933 (New Guinea)
 Priochirus confusus Cameron, 1937 (New Guinea)
 Priochirus curtidentatus Wu & Zhou, 2013 (China)
 Priochirus deltodontus Wu & Zhou, 2013 (China)
 Priochirus greensladei Herman, 2001 (New Guinea)
 Priochirus japonicus Sharp, 1889 (Taiwan, China, Japan)
 Priochirus kimurai Naomi, 1996 (Japan)
 Priochirus klimai Bernhauer, 1914 (Indonesia)
 Priochirus lautus P. J. M. Greenslade, 1971 (Papua New Guinea)
 Priochirus masahiroiNaomi, 1996 (Japan)
 Priochirus minor P. J. M. Greenslade, 1971 (Borneo)
 Priochirus mjobergi Bernhauer, 1928 (Indonesia)
 Priochirus minutus Wendeler, 1928 (Philippines)
 Priochirus quadricollis Cameron, 1924 (New Guinea)
 Priochirus reno P. J. M. Greenslade, 1971 (Papua New Guinea)
 Priochirus salvini Sharp, 1887 (Guatemala)
 Priochirus sondaicus Bernhauer, 1928 (Indonesia)
 Priochirus terebra P. J. M. Greenslade, 1971 (Papua New Guinea)
 Priochirus tridens Motschulsky, 1857 (India, Andaman Islands, Myanmar, Malaysia, Indonesia, Philippines)
 Priochirus trifurcus Wu & Zhou, 2013 (China)
 Priochirus unicolor Laporte, 1835 (Indonesia)

References 

 Herman, L.H. 2001 H. Catalog of the Staphylinidae (Insecta, Coleoptera): 1758 to the end of the second millennium. III. Oxyteline group Bulletin of the American Museum of Natural History, (265): 1067–1806.
 Zipcodezoo
 Universal Biological Indexer

Staphylinidae genera
Osoriinae
Beetles of Asia
Beetles of Australia
Beetles of New Zealand
Beetles of Oceania